Samedan is a town and municipality in the Maloja Region in the Swiss canton of Grisons.  It is served by Samedan railway station on the Rhaetian Railway network and by the Samedan Airport.

History
Samedan is first mentioned in 1139 as Samaden. In 1334 it was mentioned as Semeden, in 1367 as Semaden, in 1498 as Sumada and in 1527 as Sameden.

Geography

Of this area, about 15.5% is used for agricultural purposes, while 9.7% is forested. Of the rest of the land, 1.9% is settled (buildings or roads) and 72.9% is unproductive land.

Before 2017, the municipality was located in the Oberengadin sub-district of the Maloja district in the central Oberengadin valley along the Inn river.  After 2017 it was part of the Maloja Region. It consists of the village of Samedan and the hamlet of Punt Muragl, the upper section of the Val Bever as well as an exclave that includes nearly the entire Val Roseg, a valley surrounded by the highest mountains of the canton: Piz Bernina, Piz Scerscen and Piz Roseg. Until 1943 Samedan was known as Samaden.

Demographics

, 23.6% of the population are resident foreign nationals. Over the last 3 years (2010–2013) the population has changed at a rate of 1.31%. The birth rate in the municipality, in 2013, was 8.3 while the death rate was 7.0 per thousand residents.

, children and teenagers (0–19 years old) make up 18.1% of the population, while adults (20–64 years old) are 64.6% and seniors (over 64 years old) make up 17.3%.

In 2013 there were 1,423 private households in Samedan.  Of the 489 inhabited buildings in the municipality, in 2000, about 21.9% were single family homes and 47.6% were multiple family buildings.  Additionally, about 22.5% of the buildings were built before 1919, while 9.4% were built between 1991 and 2000.  In 2012 the rate of construction of new housing units per 1000 residents was 31.86.  The vacancy rate for the municipality, was 2.14%.

Historic population
The historical population is given in the following chart:

Languages
Most of the population speaks German (61.5%), with Romansh being second most common (16.7%) and Italian being third (14.9%).  Originally, the entire population spoke the Upper-Engadin Romansh dialect of Putèr.  Due to increasing trade with the outside world, Romansh usage began to decline in the 19th century.  In 1880, only 47% spoke Romansh as a first language, while in 1910, it was 45% and in 1941, it was 42%.  The Romansh-speaking percentage dropped until, in 1970, only 31% spoke it as their first language.  In the 1980s, Romansh speakers increased slightly, but since then, the proportion has decreased.  However, in 2000, there were 42% who understood Romansh even if it was not their first language.

Politics
In the 2015 federal election the most popular party was the SVP with 23.8% of the vote.  The next three most popular parties were the FDP (22.5%), the BDP (19.6%) and the SP (16.4%).  In the federal election, a total of 821 votes were cast, and the voter turnout was 42.3%.

In the 2007 federal election the most popular party was the SP which received 30.6% of the vote.  The next three most popular parties were the SVP (28.7%), the FDP (28.2%) and the CVP (10.4%).

Education
In Samedan about 75.7% of the population (between age 25–64) have completed either non-mandatory upper secondary education or additional higher education (either university or a Fachhochschule).

Transportation

It is the administrative center of the upper Engadin region, and services include a regional hospital (Spital Oberengadin), a major RhB railway station with regular trains towards Pontresina, Chur and St. Moritz, and a regional airport (Engadin Airport). Both the Bernina Express and Glacier Express trains pass Samedan.

The funicular Muottas-Muragl-Bahn leads to the top of Muottas Muragl (2454 m).

Economy
, there were a total of 2,891 people employed in the municipality.  Of these, a total of 26 people worked in 8 businesses in the primary economic sector.  The secondary sector employed 500 workers in 51 separate businesses.  Finally, the tertiary sector provided 2,365 jobs in 335 businesses.  In 2013 a total of 31.9% of the population received social assistance.

Heritage sites of national significance
The Catholic Church of the Sacred Heart and the Library of Fundaziun de Planta are listed as Swiss heritage sites of national significance.

Climate
Köppen-Geiger climate classification classifies its climate as subarctic (Dfc). Between 1961 and 1990 Samedan had an average of 95.5 days of rain per year and on average received  of precipitation. During this month there was precipitation for an average of 11.5 days.

Cultural references
The Upper Engadine Cultural Archives is housed in the Chesa Planta in Samedan.

James Bond escapes from Blofeld's base at Piz Gloria to Samedan in Ian Fleming's On Her Majesty's Secret Service where he is rescued by his future wife, Tracy.

The nineteenth century campaigner for women's rights and the repeal of the Contagious Diseases Acts, Josephine Butler, holidayed in Samedan in 1881 preferring it to Pontresina. She walked extensively with friends whilst her husband, because of his rheumatism, painted and sketched. He preached at the local Protestant church, which was largely run by another English clergyman Mr Eardley.

References

External links
Official website 

 
Cultural property of national significance in Graubünden